The Montemarcello Formation is a Late Triassic (Carnian) geologic formation in Liguria, Italy. Fossil prosauropod tracks have been reported from the formation.

Description 
The formation comprises arenites with a few thin clayey inter-beds. Two-dimensional ripple marks (with wavelengths of nearly ), larger ripples (wavelengths of ), interference ripples, and mud cracks were recognized. The arenitic beds are also characterized by internal structures such as accretionary laminae, coalescent bodies, low-angle lamination, and cross stratification. Some arenitic levels are deeply bioturbated, both by simple vertical tubes and by larger horizontal ones. Rare small wood fragments were recognized.

Fossil content 
The following fossils were reported from the formation:
 Evazoum sirigui
 Anomoepus sp.
 Eosauropus sp.
 Grallator (Eubrontes)
 Chirotheriidae indet.

See also 
 List of dinosaur-bearing rock formations
 List of stratigraphic units with sauropodomorph tracks
 Prosauropod tracks
 List of fossiliferous stratigraphic units in Italy

References

Bibliography 

 
  
 
 
 

Geologic formations of Italy
Triassic System of Europe
Triassic Italy
Carnian Stage
Sandstone formations
Shale formations
Fluvial deposits
Ichnofossiliferous formations
Paleontology in Italy